is a professional Japanese baseball player. He plays pitcher for the Chunichi Dragons.

External links

 NPB.com

1991 births
Living people
People from Chita, Aichi
Baseball people from Aichi Prefecture
Keio University alumni
Japanese baseball players
Nippon Professional Baseball pitchers
Chunichi Dragons players